William Colton is an American politician.

William Colton may also refer to:

 William Paul Colton, Bishop of Cork, Cloyne and Ross
 William Robert Colton (1867–1921), British sculptor
William F. Colton, namesake of Colton, Utah
William Colton, a character in The Loner
Billy Colton, a character in The Coltons